Pedro Bonelli (born 20 October 1956) is a Peruvian footballer. He played in five matches for the Peru national football team in 1983. He was also part of Peru's squad for the 1983 Copa América tournament.

References

1956 births
Living people
Peruvian footballers
Peru international footballers
Association football forwards
Sportspeople from Callao